The Women's bantamweight (53 kilograms) event at the 2014 Asian Games took place on 30 September 2014 at Ganghwa Dolmens Gymnasium, Incheon, South Korea.

A total of sixteen competitors from sixteen countries competed in this event, limited to fighters whose body weight was less than 53 kilograms.

Huang Yun-wen of Chinese Tapei won the title and gold medal after beating Yoon Jeong-yeon of South Korea in the gold medal match by the score of 4–2.

The bronze medal was shared by Wu Jingyu of China and Sousan Hajipour from Iran. Athletes from Vietnam, Thailand, Uzbekistan and India lost in quarterfinals and finished fifth.

Schedule
All times are Korea Standard Time (UTC+09:00)

Results

References

External links
Official website

Taekwondo at the 2014 Asian Games